Elections to Falkirk Council was held on 4 May 2017, the same day as the 31 other local authorities in Scotland. The election used the nine wards created under the Local Governance (Scotland) Act 2004, with 30 councillors being elected, a reduction of 2 members from 2012. Each ward elected either 3 or 4 members, using the STV electoral system.

Following the 2012 election, the controlling administration consisted of 14 Labour members, 2 Conservative and 1 Independent (Cllr Buchanan). Opposition is 13 SNP members and 2 Independent (Cllrs Spears and McCabe). The Council Leader is Cllr Craig C Martin, Provost is Cllr Reid and the Depute Provost Cllr Patrick.

Election result summary 

Note: "Votes" are the first preference votes. The net gain/loss and percentage changes relate to the result of the previous Scottish local elections in May 2012. The number of Falkirk Council seats was reduced by 2 in the 2017 election. This may differ from other published sources showing gain/loss relative to seats held at dissolution of Scotland's councils.

Ward results

Bo'ness and Blackness
2012: 2xSNP; 1xLab
2017: 1xSNP; 1xLab; 1xCon
2012-2017 Change: Conservative gain one seat from SNP

Grangemouth
2012: 2xLab; 1xSNP; 1xIndependent
2017: 1xLab; 1xSNP; 1xIndependent
2012-2017 Change: 1 less seat compared to 2012. Labour lose seat.

Denny and Banknock
2012: 2xSNP; 1xLab; 1xIndependent
2017: 2xSNP; 1xLab; 1xCon
2012-2017 Change:  Conservative gain 1 seat from Independent

Carse, Kinnaird & Tryst
2012: 2xLab; 2xSNP
2017: 2xSNP; 1xLab; 1xCon
2012-2017 Change: Conservative gain 1 seat from Labour

 = Outgoing Councillor for Grangemouth ward.

Bonnybridge and Larbert
2012: 1xSNP; 1xLab; 1xIndependent
2017: 1xSNP; 1xCon; 1xIndependent
2012-2017 Change: Conservative gain 1 seat from Labour

Falkirk North
2012: 2xSNP; 2xLab
2017: 2xSNP; 2xLab
2012-2017 Change: No change

 

 = Outgoing Councillor for Falkirk South.

Falkirk South
2012: 2xLab; 1xSNP; 1xCon
2017: 1xLab; 1xSNP; 1xCon
2012-2017 Change: 1 less seat compared to 2012. Labour lose seat.

 

= Sitting Councillor from Falkirk North.

Lower Braes
2012: 1xCon; 1xSNP; 1xLab
2017: 1xCon; 1xSNP; 1xLab
2012-2017 Change: No change

Upper Braes
2012: 2xLab; 1xSNP
2017: 1xCon; 1xSNP; 1xLab
2012-2017 Change: Conservative gain 1 seat from Labour

Changes since 2017
† On 30 November 2017 Bonnybridge and Larbert SNP Cllr Tom Coleman died following a short illness. A by-election was held on 15 February 2018 and the seat was retained by his son, Niall.
†† On 21 September 2018 Upper Braes Labour Cllr John McLuckie and Conservative Cllr James Kerr were suspended by both of their respective parties and became Independents having been charged by the police following an investigation into planning irregularities in Falkirk although both being cleared at a later date.
†††On 29 July 2021 Falkirk South Labour Cllr Pat Reid announced he was resigning his seat. A by-election will be held on 14 October and was gained by Emma Russell of the SNP.

By-elections since 2017

References 

2017
2017 Scottish local elections